Tresorit is a cloud storage service with end-to-end encryption.

Founded in 2011, Tresorit closed an €11.5M Series B financing round in 2018 and was featured on FT1000 by Financial Times 2020 as the fifth fastest-growing cybersecurity company in Europe.

The software is available for Windows, macOS, Android, iOS, and Linux, and the company has released plugins for Gmail and Outlook. As of 2022, Swiss Post owns a majority stake in the cloud storage service. Tresorit works as an independent entity under Swiss Post. The company has offices in Zurich, Switzerland; Munich, Germany; and Budapest, Hungary, employing around 100 people.

History

Tresorit was founded in 2011 by Istvan Lam (CEO), Szilveszter Szebeni (CIO) and Gyorgy Szilagyi (CPO). In the coming years, Andrea Skaliczki joined as CFO, Istvan Hartung as CTO and Arno van Züren as CSO. The company officially launched its client-side encrypted cloud storage service after emerging from its stealth beta version in April 2014.

In 2013 and 2014, Tresorit hosted a hacking contest offering $10,000 to anyone who hacked their data encryption methods to gain access to their servers. After some months, the reward was increased to $25,000 and later to $50,000, challenging experts from institutions like Harvard, Stanford or MIT. The contest ran for 468 days and according to the company, nobody was able to break the encryption.

In August 2015, Wuala (owned by LaCie and Seagate), a pioneer of secure cloud storage, announced it was closing its service after 7 years and recommended its users choose Tresorit as their secure cloud alternative.

In 2016, Tresorit launched a beta of the software development kit (SDK) ZeroKit. In January 2017, Apple's SDK project CareKit announced the option for mobile app developers using CareKit to integrate ZeroKit, enabling zero-knowledge user authentication and encryption for medical and health apps.

In 2017, Tresorit patented its shareable encryption technology in the US under no. US 9563783 B2, and LogMeIn co-founder Marton Anka joined Tresorit as an investor and advisor.

In 2019, Tresorit reached the number of 100 employees, and Tresorit improved its governance feature set with e-mail verification and detailed user reports.

In July 2021, Tresorit was acquired by the Swiss Post to further expand its presence in its core German-speaking markets, including Germany, Austria, and Switzerland.

Technology
Tresorit uses AES 256 encryption. With Tresorit's end-to-end encryption, every file and relevant metadata on user devices are encrypted with unique, randomly generated encryption keys. These keys are never sent to Tresorit's servers in an unencrypted format. Accessing files is only possible with a user's unique private decryption key.

Tresorit uses random keys for each file and random IVs for each version of a file. The company claims that two identical files look completely different after encryption, thus they cannot be compared or matched.

Due to its zero-knowledge system, Tresorit does not store passwords, only the user can access his/her own password. Administrators of a business Tresorit account can reset passwords in exceptional cases but can never access those.

Awards
In 2017, Tresorit was named one of the Rising Stars at Deloitte's Technology Fast 50 Central Europe Award. In 2019, Tresorit was named as a Global Leader in Cloud Computing at the Stratus Awards. In 2020, Tresorit was named a 2020 Gartner Peer Insights Customers' Choice for Content Collaboration Tools and was featured on FT1000 by Financial Times 2020 as the fifth fastest-growing cybersecurity company in Europe.

See also 
 Comparison of file hosting services
 Comparison of online backup services
 Remote backup service

References

File sharing services
Cloud storage
Cloud applications
Online backup services
Data synchronization
Email attachment replacements
File hosting
File hosting for macOS
File hosting for Windows
File hosting for Linux
MacOS software
Linux software
Cryptographic software
Productivity software
Companies' terms of service